Wurfbainia elegans is a species of plants in the Zingiberaceae family. It is endemic to the Philippines.

Habitat and ecology
The species is abundant in the secondary forest of Camp 7 Experimental Forest Station, Minglanilla, Cebu. The forest, with a relatively dry season from November to April, and wet season the rest of the year, was dominated by Sarcandra glabra, Artocarpus odoratissimus and Donax canniformis.

History
The Singapore based English botanist Henry Nicholas Ridley described the species Amomum elegans in 1906. The genus and species were revised in 2018 by the botanists Jana  Škorničkova (born 1975) and Axel Dalberg Poulsen (born 1961, Danmark), in the journal Taxon.

References 

elegans
Plants described in 2018
Endemic flora of the Philippines